Dang may refer to:

Music
 "Dang!" (song), a 2015 song by Mac Miller from The Divine Feminine
 "Dang!", a 2018 song by GreatGuys from Trigger

People
 Dang (surname) with origins in both Asiatic and Indo-European languages
 Dang, a pseudonym of animator Dan Gordon
 Dang Ngoc Long (born 1957), Vietnamese guitarist

Places
 Dang, Uttar Pradesh, a village Uttar Pradesh, India
 Dang, Iran, a village in Fars Province, Iran
 Dang (Vidhan Sabha constituency), Gujarat, India
 Dang district, India, a district in Gujarat, India
 Dang District, Nepal, a district in Lumbini Province, Nepal
 Dang Valley, a valley in western Nepal

Other
 Dang, a minced oath for "damnation"
 , the Communist Party of Vietnam

See also
 "Dang Me", a 1964 song by Roger Miller